The 1901 Delaware football team represented Delaware College—now known as the University of Delaware–as an independent during the 1901 college football season. Led by Herbert Rice in his fifth and final year as head coach, Delaware compiled a record of 5–4.

Schedule

References

Delaware
Delaware Fightin' Blue Hens football seasons
Delaware football